Reverse is a 2019 Iranian Crime-drama film written and directed by Poulad Kimiayi.

Plot 
Salar (Babak Hamidian) is a mobile Auto mechanic whose wife was recently killed in a car accident. His wife's family has complained to Salar and blamed Salar for the accident,They have demanded ransom from him and he has been in prison for a while because of this. After meeting his father's old friend, Reza Dardashti. Reza Dardashti tells him facts about his parents' past and offers him an illegal car race to make money.

Cast 
 Babak Hamidian
 Shahram Haghighat Doost
 Leila Zare
 Parvaneh Massoumi
 Ali Reza Kamali 
 Akbar Zanjanpour
 Siavash Tahmoures
 Akbar Moazezi
 Houman Sedighi

References

External links

2019 films
2010s Persian-language films
Films about automobiles
Auto racing films
Iranian drama films
2019 drama films